Reconfigurine is a remix album by Figurine, released in 2002.

Track listing
"F>I>G>U>R>I>N>E> (Reconfigurine Theme)" (Figurine remix) – 1:02
"I Wait for You (By the Telephone)" (Pacifica remix) – 2:58
"Eurodiscoteque" (Technicolor remix) – 4:45
"My First UFO" (ckid remix) – 1:49
"You" (David Figurine remix) – 3:53
"Tired Eyes" (DJ Blank remix) – 4:15
"International Space Station" (David Figurine remix) – 5:48
"City 2 City" – 4:25
"S.O.S." (Double Agent remix) – 3:24
"Batteries (Can't Help Me Now)" (Mall remix) – 4:26
"The European Beauty" (Phasmid remix) – 3:48
"Robots 2002" (Figurine remix) – 2:28
"New Mate" (Steward remix) – 2:45
"New Millennium Song" (Flowchart remix) – 6:55
"An Electronic Address" (Printed Circuit remix) – 4:08
"Digits" (Accelera Deck remix) – 12:08
Untitled – 0:13

Figurine (band) albums
2002 remix albums